John of Perugia and Peter of Sassoferrato, were both Franciscan friars, who in 1216, were sent by St. Francis, to preach and convert the Moors, at Teruel and Valencia. Both of them would go on to suffer martyrdom in 1231, at Valencia.

References

Italian Roman Catholic saints
Spanish Roman Catholic saints
13th-century Christian saints
1231 deaths
Spanish Franciscans
Year of birth unknown
Italian Franciscans
13th-century Roman Catholic martyrs